FAM227A is a protein that in humans is encoded by FAM227A gene. Current studies have determined the location of this gene to be in the nuclear region of the cell.  FAM227A is most highly expressed in the tissues of the fallopian tube, testis, and pituitary gland.  FAM227A is present in species of mammals, birds and reptiles, and gene alignment sequences have shown that FAM227A is a rapidly evolving gene.

Gene 
FAM227A is found on chromosome 22 at the location 22q13.1.  It is flanked by the gene LOC105373031 on the left and CBY1 on the right.  The gene is 78,510 base pairs long with 21 exons.  There are currently no aliases for FAM227A.

mRNA 
There are two isoforms of FAM227A.  The first isoform, NM_001013647.1, has a shorter transcript but a longer isoform. It is 2,948 base pairs long, and includes the first 17 exons.  The second isoform, NM_001291030.1, is 10,362 base pairs long.  It starts translation at a different start codon than variant 1 by utilizing an alternate splice site.  The 5’ region is relatively short but the 3’ region is very long.

Protein 

The primary sequence for FAM227A is isoform 1 with accession number: NP_001013669.1.  It is 570 amino acids long.  There are 9 isoforms.  The molecular weight is 66kD, and the isoelectric point is 9.6. Compared to other proteins in humans, FAM227A has less abundant glycine and more abundant hydrophobic amino acids and positively charges amino acids.  The protein is predicted to be in the nuclear region of the cell. Three nuclear signals include HKKK at 129(pat 4), KKK at 130(pat4), and PKKTKIK at 410(pat7).  An FWWh region, where h signifies hydrophobic, runs from amino acids 135-296 in Homo sapiens. Most eukaryotic proteins contain this sequence. The function of this region is still unknown. Motifs in FAM227A include KRK, SGK, and RRE.

Secondary Structure 
The secondary structure is predicted to be made up of alpha helices mainly. but also beta pleated sheets.

Post-Translational Modification 
Phosphorylation is the only predicted post-translational modification.  There are three experimentally determined phosphorylation sites at Y343, S348, and S349.

Expression 
FAM227A is experimentally determined to be highly expressed in the testis, epididymis, pituitary gland, and the fallopian tubes.  This protein is not predicted to be ubiquitous as the rate of expression varies across tissue types.

Function 
Currently, the function of FAM227A has not been characterized.

Interacting Proteins 
Currently, there are no predicted proteins that interact with FAM227A

Subcellular Localization 
FAM227A is predicted to be located in the nuclear region of the cell.  This prediction is consistent across species.

Homology 
Paralogs: FAM227B

Orthologs: FAM227A is present mainly in mammals but also in species of reptiles and birds.  The most distantly related ortholog is Xenopus tropicalis, the Western Clawed Frog.  Based on the years of divergence for FAM227A, the gene evolved very rapidly.

Clinical Significance 
In 2016, a study  performed an association analysis on chromosome 22 at 31203 markers in order to determine if high blood pressure and smoking were correlated. Chromosome 22 was chosen based on the results of the data collected from three clinical visits at the Framingham Heart Study. In 2013, researchers investigated 3 clusters of SNP's thought to be linked to prostate cancer in Arab populations. The study found that the deletion region on chromosome 22q13, where FAM227A is located, can also be linked to breast and colorectal cancer in humans in addition to prostate cancer3.  Another study suggests the location of FAM227A may be linked to a central regulator, SOX10, which is involved in the maturation of neural crest derivatives. Gene deletion of FAM227A was linked to lung abnormality, atrial septum defect, small size for gestational age, and sensorineural hearing loss in this study.

References 

Genes on human chromosome 22